Todorov, feminine Todorova is a Bulgarian surname. Notable people with the name include:

Athletes
 Antoaneta Todorova (born 1963), Bulgarian javelin thrower
 Daniela Todorova (born 1980), Bulgarian Paralympian 
 Dimitrinka Todorova (1974–2020), Bulgarian gymnast
 Georgi Todorov (born 1960), Bulgarian shot putter
 Georgi Todorov (born 1951), Bulgarian weightlifter, 1976 Olympics silver medalist
 Nikolay Todorov (footballer, born 1964), Bulgarian football manager
 Nikolay Todorov (footballer, born 1996), Bulgarian footballer
 Rita Todorova (born 1958), Bulgarian rower
 Serafim Todorov (born 1969), Bulgarian boxer
 Stanimir Todorov (born 1982), Bulgarian figure skater
 Stefan Todorov (born 1982), Bulgarian footballer
 Svetoslav Todorov (born 1978), Bulgarian footballer
 Todor Todorov (born 1982), Bulgarian footballer
 Yordan Todorov (footballer, born July 1981), Bulgarian footballer
 Yordan Todorov (footballer, born November 1981), Bulgarian footballer
 Yordan Todorov (footballer, born 1999), Bulgarian footballer
 Zdravko Todorov (born 1982), Bulgarian footballer

Other
 Elitsa Todorova (born 1977), Bulgarian neo-folk singer
 Elka Todorova (fl. 2002), Bulgarian academician and writer on sociology and psychology
 Paunka Todorova (born 1930), Bulgarian chess player
 Georgi Todorov (1864–1934), Bulgarian general
 Krisia Todorova (born 2004), Bulgarian child singer and Junior Eurovision Song Contest contestant
 Maria Todorova (born 1949, daughter of Nikolai below), Bulgarian historian (Imagining the Balkans, 1997)
 Mariana Todorova (born 1974), Bulgarian violinist
 Nikolai Todorov (1921–2003), Bulgarian historian; in 1990 acting President of Bulgaria.
 Nayden Todorov (born 1974), Bulgarian pianist, composer, and conductor
 Petko Todorov (1879–1916), Bulgarian writer
 Stanko Todorov (1920–1996), Bulgarian communist politician
 Todor Todorov (sculptor) (born 1951), Bulgarian sculptor
 Tzvetan Todorov (1939–2017), Bulgarian-French historian, philosopher, critic and sociologist

See also
 Fyodorov, Russian cognate

Bulgarian-language surnames
Patronymic surnames
Surnames from given names